Not Without Laughter is the debut novel by Langston Hughes published in 1930.

Plot introduction
Not Without Laughter portrays African-American life in Kansas in the 1910s, focusing on the effects of class and religion on the community.
The main storyline focuses on Sandy's "awakening to the sad and the beautiful realities of black life in a small Kansas town."

Characters
Sandy Rodgers 
Jimboy Rodgers – Sandy's father, Annjee's husband
Annjelica "Annjee" Rodgers – Sandy's mother, wife of Jimboy
Aunt Hager Williams – Annjee's mother and Sandy's grandmother
Tempy Siles/Williams – Annjee's sister
Mr. Siles – Tempy's husband
Harriett Williams – sister of Annjee
Maudel Smothers – friend of Harriett
Willie-Mae Johnson – friend of Sandy

Background
Hughes said that Not Without Laughter is semi-autobiographical, and that a good portion of the characters and setting included in the novel are based on his memories of growing up in Lawrence, Kansas: "I wanted to write about a typical Negro family in the Middle West, about people like those I had known in Kansas. But mine was not a typical Negro family."

Reception
A review in the New York Times on August 3, 1930 stated: " "Not Without Laughter" is very slow, even tedious, reading in its early chapters, but once it gains its momentum it moves as swiftly as a jazz rhythm. Its characters, emerging ever more clearly and challenging as the novel proceeds, gives it this rhythm. Every character in the novel, it can be said, with the exception of Tempy and Mr. Siles, is a living challenge to our civilization, a challenge that is all the more effective because it springs naturally out of its materials and is not superimposed upon them."

References

1930 American novels
Works by Langston Hughes
Random House books
African-American novels
Novels set in Kansas
1930 debut novels